Payyan dynasty  is the family which manage and administer Swamithope pathi, the temple of Ayyavazhi.

Payyan in Arul Nool
A quote in Arul Nool refers 'Payyan' in Pathiram.

References
 Akilattirattu Ammanai published by T.Palaramachandran Nadar, 1989, 9th impression
 N.Elango & Vijaya Shanthi Elango Ayya Vaikuntar the light of the world, 1997, The Gurukulam

History of Ayyavazhi
Swamithope pathi